Cypriot Greek (  or  ) is the variety of Modern Greek that is spoken by the majority of the Cypriot populace and Greek Cypriot diaspora. It is considered a divergent dialect as it differs from Standard Modern Greek in various aspects of its lexicon, phonetics, phonology, morphology, syntax and even pragmatics, not only for historical reasons, but also because of geographical isolation, different settlement patterns, and extensive contact with typologically distinct languages.

Classification
 
Cypriot Greek is not an evolution of ancient Arcadocypriot Greek, but derives from Byzantine Medieval Greek. It has traditionally been placed in the southeastern group of Modern Greek varieties, along with the dialects of the Dodecanese and Chios (with which it shares several phonological phenomena).

Though Cypriot Greek tends to be regarded as a dialect by its speakers, it is unintelligible to speakers of Standard Modern Greek without adequate prior exposure. Greek-speaking Cypriot society is diglossic, with vernacular Cypriot Greek (the "low" variety) and Standard Modern Greek (the "high" variety). Cypriot Greek is itself a dialect continuum with an emerging koine. Davy, Ioannou & Panayotou (1996) have argued that diglossia has given way to a "post-diglossic [dialectal] continuum [...] a quasi-continuous spread of overlapping varieties".

History

Cyprus was cut off from the rest of the Greek-speaking world from the 7th to the 10th century AD due to Arab attacks. It was reintegrated in the Byzantine Empire in 962 to be isolated again in 1191 when it fell to the hands of the Crusaders. These periods of isolation led to the development of various linguistic characteristics distinct from Byzantine Greek.

The oldest surviving written works in Cypriot date back to the Medieval period. Some of these are: the legal code of the Kingdom of Cyprus, the Assizes of Jerusalem; the chronicles of Leontios Machairas and Georgios Voustronios; and a collection of sonnets in the manner of Francesco Petrarca. In the past hundred years, the dialect has been used in poetry (with major poets being Vasilis Michaelides and Dimitris Lipertis).

Cypriot Greek had been historically used by some members of the Turkish Cypriot community, especially after the end of Ottoman control and consequent British administration of the island. In 1960, it was reported that 38% of the Turkish Cypriots were able to speak Greek along with Cypriot Turkish. Some Turkish Cypriots of Nicosia and Paphos were also speaking Cypriot Greek as their mother tongue according to early 20th century population records.

In the late 1970s, Minister of Education Chrysostomos A. Sofianos upgraded the status of Cypriot by introducing it in education. The 2006 feature film Pirates of the Caribbean: Dead Man's Chest features actor Jimmy Roussounis arguing in Cypriot with another crew member speaking Kibrizlija (Cypriot Turkish) about a captain's hat they find in the sea. Peter Polycarpou routinely spoke in Cypriot in his role as Chris Theodopolopoudos in the British television comedy series Birds of a Feather. In a July 2014 episode of the American TV series The Leftovers, Alex Malaos's character uses the dialect saying "" ('I understood'). In the American mockumentary comedy horror television series What We Do in the Shadows, actress Natasia Demetriou, as the vampiric character Nadja, occasionally exclaims phrases in Cypriot.

Today, Cypriot Greek is the only variety of Modern Greek with a significant presence of spontaneous use online, including blogs and internet forums, and there exists a variant of Greeklish that reflects its distinct phonology.

Phonology
Studies of the phonology of Cypriot Greek are few and tend to examine very specific phenomena, e.g. gemination, "glide hardening".

Consonants

Stops  and affricate  are unaspirated and may be pronounced weakly voiced in fast speech.  are always heavily aspirated and they are never preceded by nasals, with the exception of some loans, e.g.

Voiced fricatives  are often pronounced as approximants and they are regularly elided when intervocalic.  is similarly often realised as an approximant  in weak positions.

The palatal lateral approximant  is most often realised as a singleton or geminate lateral  or a singleton or geminate fricative , and sometimes as a glide  (cf. yeísmo).

The palatal nasal  is produced somewhat longer than other singleton nasals, though not as long as geminates.  is similarly "rather long".

The alveolar trill  is the geminate counterpart of the tap .

Palatalisation and glide hardening

The glide is not assimilated, but hardens to an obstruent  after  and to  after .

Geminates
There is considerable disagreement on how to classify Cypriot Greek geminates, though they are now generally understood to be "geminates proper" (rather than clusters of identical phonemes or "fortis" consonants). Geminates are 1.5 to 2 times longer than singletons, depending, primarily, on position and stress. Geminates occur both word-initially and word-medially. Word-initial geminates tend to be somewhat longer.  have found that "for stops, in particular, this lengthening affects both closure duration and VOT", but  claim that stops contrast only in aspiration, and not duration.  undertook a perceptual study with thirty native speakers of Cypriot Greek, and has found that both closure duration and (the duration and properties of) aspiration provide important cues in distinguishing between the two kinds of stops, but aspiration is slightly more significant.

Assimilatory processes
Word-final  assimilates with succeeding consonants—other than stops and affricates—at word boundaries producing post-lexical geminates. Consequently, geminate voiced fricatives, though generally not phonemic, do occur as allophones.  Below are some examples of geminates to arise from sandhi.
  →   "Lucas" (acc.)
  →   "[s/he] is here"
  →   "from the root"

In contrast, singleton stops and affricates do not undergo gemination, but become fully voiced when preceded by a nasal, with the nasal becoming homorganic. This process is not restricted to terminal nasals; singleton stops and affricates always become voiced following a nasal.
  →   "[we] smoke cigars"
  →   "even though"
  →   "on Sunday"

Word-final  is altogether elided before geminate stops and consonant clusters:
  →   "[we] bought flowers"
  →   "on the head"

  →   "let it snow"

Lastly, word-final  becomes voiced when followed by a voiced consonant belonging to the same phrase, like in Standard Greek:
  →   "of Malta"
  →   "race"

Vowels

Cypriot Greek has a five-vowel system   that is nearly identical to that of Standard Modern Greek.

Close vowels  following  at the end of an utterance are regularly reduced (50% of all cases presented in study) to "fricated vowels" (40% of all cases, cf. Slavic yers), and are sometimes elided altogether (5% of all cases).

"one" (f.).

Stress
Cypriot Greek has "dynamic" stress. Both consonants and vowels are longer in stressed than in unstressed syllables, and the effect is stronger word-initially. There is only one stress per word, and it can fall on any of the last four syllables. Stress on the fourth syllable from the end of a word is rare and normally limited to certain verb forms. Because of this possibility, however, when words with antepenultimate stress are followed by an enclitic in Cypriot Greek, no extra stress is added (unlike Standard Modern Greek, where the stress can only fall on one of the last three syllables), e.g. Cypriot Greek  , Standard Modern Greek   "my bicycle".

Grammar

Vocabulary
More loanwords are in everyday use than in Standard Modern Greek. These come from Old French, Italian, Occitan, Turkish and, increasingly, from English. There are also Arabic expressions (via Turkish) like   "mashallah" and   "inshallah". Much of the Cypriot core vocabulary is different from the modern standard's, e.g.   in addition to  "I talk",   instead of  "I look", etc.
Ethnologue reports that the lexical similarity between Cypriot Greek and Demotic Greek is in the range of 84–93%.

Orthography

There is no established orthography for Cypriot Greek. Efforts have been made to introduce diacritics to the Greek alphabet to represent palato-alveolar consonants found in Cypriot, but not in Standard Modern Greek, e.g. the combining caron , by the authors of the "Syntychies" lexicographic database at the University of Cyprus. When diacritics are not used, an epenthetic —often accompanied by the systematic substitution of the preceding consonant letter—may be used to the same effect (as in Polish), e.g. Standard Modern Greek   → Cypriot Greek  , Standard Modern Greek   → Cypriot Greek  .

Geminates (and aspirates) are represented by two of the same letter, e.g.   "today", though this may not be done in cases where the spelling would not coincide with Standard Modern Greek's, e.g.  would still be spelt .

See also
 Languages of Cyprus
 Arcadocypriot Greek for the ancient Greek spoken on Cyprus

Footnotes
Explanatory notes

Citations

Bibliography

Further reading

 
 
 
 
 
 
 
 
 
 
 
 
 
 
 

Varieties of Modern Greek
Greek, Cypriot
Cyprus–Greece relations